Otherworld, in comics, may refer to:
 Avalon (Marvel Comics), a Marvel Comics location, also known as Otherworld
 Otherworld (DC Comics), a creator-owned Vertigo series by Phil Jimenez

See also
 Otherworld (disambiguation)
 Otherplace, Marvel Comics demonic limbo
 Avalon (comics)